Mikhaylovka is a rural locality (a selo) and the administrative center of Mikhaylovsky Selsoviet, Ust-Kalmansky District, Altai Krai, Russia. The population was 1,419 as of 2013. There are 18 streets.

Geography 
Mikhaylovka is located 57 km southeast of Ust-Kalmanka (the district's administrative centre) by road. Antonyevka is the nearest rural locality.

References 

Rural localities in Ust-Kalmansky District